Greenstead Green and Halstead Rural is a civil parish in the Braintree district, in the county of Essex, England. The parish includes the village of Greenstead Green and the hamlet of Burton's Green, Plaistow Green and Whiteash Green. In 2011 the parish had a population of 670. The parish touches Coggeshall, Colne Engaine, Earls Colne, Gosfield, Great Maplestead, Halstead, Little Maplestead, Pebmarsh, Sible Hedingham and Stisted and surrounds the urban parish of Halstead. There are 35 listed buildings in Greenstead Green and Halstead Rural.

History 
On 31 December 1894 the parish was created from Halstead as Halstead Rural, on 1 October 1934 527 acres was transferred to Halstead Urban. On 1 April 1974 it was renamed to "Greenstead Green and Halstead Rural".

References

External links 
 Parish council

Civil parishes in Essex
Braintree District